EICAR is a drug which acts as an inhibitor of the enzyme IMP dehydrogenase. It is a nucleoside derivative which has both anti-cancer and antiviral effects, and was originally developed for the treatment of leukemia, but was unsuccessful in human clinical trials. It has broad spectrum antiviral effects with activity against pox viruses, Semliki forest virus, Junin virus, reovirus, influenza, measles virus and respiratory syncytial virus among others, although it is not active against coronaviridae 
such as SARS-CoV-1. This useful spectrum of activity means that EICAR and related derivatives continue to be investigated for the treatment of viral diseases.

References 

Antiviral drugs